Philippe Esteves (born December 12, 1983, in Caracas, Venezuela) is a former Venezuelan footballer currently playing for clubs of Venezuela and Chile.

Teams
  Caracas Futbol Club 1999–2002 
  Trujillanos Club Futbol 2003–2004
  Union Atletico Maracaibo 2004–2005
  Vigia Futbol Club 2005
  Carabobo FC 2005–2007
  Deportes Concepción 2007
  Zulia FC 2007–2010
  Unión Atlético Maracaibo 2010
  Atletico Venezuela 2010–2011
  Centro Italo 2011–12

References
 Profile at BDFA 
 

1983 births
Living people
Venezuelan footballers
Carabobo F.C. players
Deportes Concepción (Chile) footballers
Zulia F.C. players
UA Maracaibo players
Venezuelan expatriate footballers
Expatriate footballers in Chile
Venezuelan expatriate sportspeople in Chile
Association football forwards